Constantin Popescu (1921–1999) was a Romanian communist politician and forestry engineer.

Between November 1952 to March 1957, he served in several cabinets under the communist regime. In particular, he was Minister of Forestry Management from November 1952 to January 1953 under Gheorghe Gheorghiu-Dej. In the next Gheorghiu-Dej cabinet, he held the same post from January to November 1953. Then, from May 1954 to October 1955, he was Forestry Agriculture Minister. Under Chivu Stoica, he was Forestry Agriculture Minister from October 1955 to January 1956. Finally, he was Forestry Management Minister from January 1956 to March 1957.

Notes

1921 births
1999 deaths
Romanian Ministers of Agriculture
Place of birth missing
Date of birth missing
Place of death missing
Date of death missing